Little Roe is an island in Yell Sound in the Shetland Islands

History

In 1841, eleven people lived here, all in the same house.

A light beacon has been built on the island.

Geography and geology
The island's name derives from its red granite.
Lamba is due north, and Uynarey, Brother Isle and Bigga between it and Yell

Wildlife
Otters occasionally visit here, and puffins and storm petrels also nest here.

See also

 List of islands of Scotland

References

Uninhabited islands of Shetland
Former populated places in Scotland